700s may refer to:
 The period from 700 to 799, almost synonymous with the 8th century (701–800).
 The period from 700 to 709, known as the 700s decade, almost synonymous with the 71st decade (701-710).
Gobosh 700S, American light-sport aircraft